The Texas A&M University College of Geosciences was a college of Texas A&M University located in College Station, Texas. The college has six academic departments and programs, including Atmospheric Sciences, Geography, Geology & Geophysics, Oceanography, Environmental Programs in Geosciences, and the Water Management & Hydrological Science (WMHS) Program. In addition, the College hosts three Research Centers and Institutes: Geochemical & Environmental Research Group (GERG), Integrated Ocean Drilling Program (IODP), and Texas Sea Grant College Program.

In 2022, the College of Geosciences merged with the College of Liberal Arts and the College of Science, along with a few other programs, to form the College of Arts & Sciences.

Facilities

The College of Geosciences is located on the main campus of Texas A&M University in College Station, Texas.

At 15 floors, it is the tallest building on campus, and hosts a Doppler weather radar System on the roof.

The Michel T. Halbouty Geosciences Building is named in honor of Distinguished Alumnus and successful oil and gas developer Michel T. Halbouty, class of 1930.

IODP is located in Research Park in a  custom built facility. It houses the Laboratory and Core Repository Facility, provides facilities for visiting scientists from around the world, and is the site of a new .5 million Core Storage Facility, which added  to the existing complex.

It houses state-of-the-art offices and laboratories for geochemical analysis. It is also the home of the Texas Automated Buoy System (TABS), which was created by the Texas General Land Grant Office in 1994 to provide real-time observations of surface currents and water temperature in the Gulf of Mexico.

Texas Sea Grant is located about three miles (5 km) southeast of the main campus of Texas A&M. It houses administrative offices, Marine Information Service and some members of the Marine Advisory Service.

Academics
The College of Geosciences offers a wide range of undergraduate and graduate degrees.
The college offers undergraduate majors in the following areas:
BS Meteorology
BS Geographic Information Science and Technology
BS Geography
BS Geology (with Environmental and Engineering Geology options)
BA Geology
BS Geophysics
BS Environmental Geosciences
BS Environmental Studies
BS Oceanography

The college offers M.S. and Ph.D. degrees in the following areas:
MS/Ph.D. Atmospheric Sciences
MS/Ph.D. Geography
MS/Ph.D. Geology
MS/Ph.D. Geophysics
MS/Ph.D. Oceanography
Master of Geoscience
Master of Water Management
MS/Ph.D. Water Management & Hydrological Science

The college offers Minors in the following areas:
Earth Sciences
Geography
Geoinformatics
Geology
Geophysics
Meteorology
Oceanography

The college has three Certificate Programs:
Geographic Information Systems
Remote Sensing
Ocean Observing Systems

Students
There are more than 7,496 former students of the College of Geosciences. In total the college has awarded 4,852 bachelor's degrees, 1,931 master's degrees, and 713 Doctoral Degrees.
As of spring 2008, there were 738 students with majors in Geosciences Degree Programs. 456 students were male, while 282 were female.

Educators
The College of Geosciences is home to 109 faculty, 3 Research Faculty, 27 Research Scientists, 140 Research Staff, and 13 Post Doctoral Fellows.
College faculty are among the most respected in their fields. They have garnered numerous awards, including:
51 Association of Former Students Distinguished Achievement Awards
10 Fulbright Scholars
5 Faculty named Regents Professors
4 Faculty named Distinguished Professors
1 Presidential Professor Awardee

Resources
As of the 2008 Fiscal Year, the Annual University Allocated Operating Budget was $14.1 million, and total endowments were $16.684 million. There are 11 Endowed Chairs, 9 Endowed Professorships, and 43 Endowed Student Scholarships/Fellowships in the College.

References

External links
College of Geosciences Home Page
Department of Atmospheric Sciences Home Page
Environmental Programs in Geosciences Home Page
Department of Geography Home Page
Department of Geology & Geophysics Home Page
Department of Oceanography Home Page
Texas Sea Grant Home Page
Integrated Ocean Drilling Program at Texas A&M Home Page
Geochemical Environmental Research Group Home Page
Texas A&M University Home Page
Texas A&M University Map

Geosciences
Geography education in the United States